The Hinsdale Formation is a geologic formation exposed in southwestern Colorado and northern New Mexico. It has a radiometric age of 4.4 to 26.8 million years, corresponding to the Neogene period.

Description
The Hinsdale Formation is a bimodal volcanic formation, containing silica-poor olivine basalt and high-silica rhyolite with only small quantities of volcanic rock of intermediate composition. The sequence reflects assimilation and fractional crystallization (AFC) of a primitive basalt magma.

The formation is the youngest volcanic formation of the San Juan volcanic field, and is separated from older units by a significant erosional surface. Radiometric ages range from 4.4 to 26.8 million years. The formation once formed an extensive thin veneer over the San Juan volcanic field before itself being eroded.

The change to bimodal association coincided with the transition from Laramide compression to Rio Grande rift extension, a pattern seen elsewhere in the western United States.

Economic geology
The rich mineralization of the San Juan Volcanic Field has been attributed to early intrusions of the Hinsdale Formation.

History of investigation
The formation was first named the Hinsdale Volcanic Series by Charles Whitman Cross in 1911 for exposures in Hinsdale County, Colorado. Larsen redefined the unit as the Hinsdale Formation and included the Los Pinos Member. Barker removed the Los Pinos as its own formation in 1958.

Footnotes

References
 
 
 
 
 
 
 
 

Neogene Colorado
Neogene formations of New Mexico